FINE MEP (Mechanical Electrical and Plumbing) is a BIM CAD software tool for Building services engineering design, built on top of IntelliCAD. It provides full IFC (Industry Foundation Classes) support, according to the 2x3 IFC Standard. FINE BIM structure, enables a smart model shaping and high design accuracy, directly applied to the real 3D building model and its building services (HVAC, water supply, sewerage, electricity). Not only the building elements (i.e. walls, openings, roofs etc.), but also the components of the mechanical/electrical installations themselves (i.e. pipes, heating units, fittings, cables etc.) are all intelligent objects carrying their own attributes and interacting among each other. MEP design is supported by specific CAD commands (i.e. smart location of units/appliances, auto-routing commands for pipes/cables etc.) and further facilitated through sophisticated recognition and validation algorithms, providing a user-friendly modeling environment.

All the six FINE MEP software vertical applications, a) FineHVAC for HVAC design, b) FineELEC for Electrical design, c) FineSANI for Sanitary design, d) FineFIRE for Fire Fighting design, e) FineGAS for Gas installation design, and f) FineLIFT for Elevator design, combine design and calculations within a synergistically integrated environment, performing all the required calculations directly from the drawings, and generating automatically all the case study results: Calculation sheets, technical reports, a complete series of final drawings updated with the calculation results (plan views, vertical diagrams, details), bill of materials, budget estimation and others.

In addition, FINE MEP applications interact in a synergistic way with the other vertical BIM software applications of the 4M Building Design Suite (i.e. IDEA Architectural and STRAD Structural). All the 4M BIM Software "work by running a single spatial database to define intelligent objects for all disciplines, whether architecture, electrical, HVAC, plumbing, elevators, and so on

See also 

Building Information Modeling
Industry Foundation Classes
Building services engineering
Mechanical engineering
Electrical engineering
Hydraulic engineering
IntelliCAD
IDEA Architectural
DWG
List of computer-aided design editors
Comparison of CAD, CAM and CAE file viewers
Comparison of CAD editors for AEC
American Society of Heating, Refrigerating and Air-Conditioning Engineers

References

External links
4M - 4M's BIM Suite website
4M - The manufacturer's website
BIM Applications listed on BuildingSmart, the "international home of open bim"
IntelliCAD success stories by ITC, the IntelliCAD Technology Consortium]
BIM booklet by Infocomm International
Institute for BIM in Canada
Managing BIM Technology in the Building Industry - AECbytes Viewpoint #35: February 12, 2008]
AECbytes Vendorhub on BIM for MEP
Article in upFront.eZine by Ralph Grabowski - upFront.eZine news #640: April 6, 2010
FineHVAC comparison with other MEP software
FINE MEP on Youtube
FineHVAC in the Ashrae online bookstore

Computer-aided design software
Building information modeling
BIM software